This article contains information about the literary events and publications of 1950.

Events
January 19 – Isaac Asimov's first full-length novel, Pebble in the Sky, is published in the United States by Doubleday.
January 26 – For the film noir Gun Crazy, released on this day in the United States, co-writer Dalton Trumbo is billed as Millard Kaufman, due to the former's inclusion on the Hollywood blacklist. This year Trumbo serves 11 months in prison for Contempt of Congress, in the federal penitentiary in Ashland, Kentucky.
February – Jack Kerouac has his first novel, The Town and the City, published in the United States.
April 8 – J. D. Salinger's wartime short story "For Esmé — with Love and Squalor" is published in The New Yorker.
May 11 – Eugène Ionesco's first play, The Bald Soprano is first performed, in Paris.
September 10 – George Bernard Shaw is taken to hospital after fracturing a hip falling out of a tree he was pruning. He is released from hospital a few weeks later after a successful operation, but suffers kidney failure and dies at his home, Shaw's Corner (Ayot St Lawrence, Hertfordshire, England), aged 94.
October – Galaxy Science Fiction magazine launches in the United States.
October 2 – The daily comic strip Peanuts, by Charles M. Schulz, makes its debut in nine United States newspapers.
October 16 – C. S. Lewis's novel The Lion, the Witch and the Wardrobe, first of the seven-book The Chronicles of Narnia, is published in the UK.
December 20 – Poet T. S. Eliot expresses concerns about "the television habit" in a letter to The Times (London).
unknown dates
Aleksandr Solzhenitsyn is sent to a "special camp" for political prisoners in Kazakhstan.
The 13th–14th century Japanese epic poem The Tale of the Heike (平家物語) is retold in modern prose by the historical novelist Eiji Yoshikawa as Shin Heike monogatari (New Tale of the Heike) and published in Asahi Weekly.
Blackwell's opens the first specialist children's bookshop, in Broad Street, Oxford (England).
Adrian Bell begins his Countryman's Notebook column in the Eastern Daily Press.

New books

Fiction
Reginald Arkell – Old Herbaceous (reissued 2002)
Isaac Asimov
I, Robot (collected short stories)
Pebble in the Sky
Georges Bataille – L'Abbé C
 Nicolas Bentley – The Floating Dutchman
Georges Bernanos – Night Is Darkest
Ray Bradbury – The Martian Chronicles
Gwen Bristow – Jubilee Trail
Pearl S. Buck – The Child Who Never Grew
John Bude – Death Steals the Show
Victor Canning 
 A Forest of Eyes
 Venetian Bird
John Dickson Carr
The Bride of Newgate
Night at the Mocking Widow (as Carter Dickson)
 Alec Coppel – Mr. Denning Drives North
 Peter Cheyney
 Dark Bahama
 Lady, Behave!
Agatha Christie
A Murder is Announced
Three Blind Mice and Other Stories
Beverly Cleary – Henry Huggins
Catherine Cookson – Kate Hannigan
William Cooper – Scenes from Provincial Life
A. J. Cronin – The Spanish Gardener
L. Sprague de Camp and P. Schuyler Miller – Genus Homo
L. Sprague de Camp and Fletcher Pratt – The Castle of Iron
Daphne du Maurier – The Parasites
Marguerite Duras – Un Barrage contre le Pacifique (The Sea Wall)
Friedrich Dürrenmatt – The Judge and His Hangman (Der Richter und sein Henker)
Hans Fallada (died 1947) – The Drinker (Der Trinker; written 1944)
Ford Madox Ford (died 1939) – Parade's End (tetralogy first published together under this title)
James Fugaté (as James Barr) – Quatrefoil: A Modern Novel
Hugh Garner – Cabbagetown
Gaito Gazdanov – The Buddha's Return (Возвращение Будды, Vozvrashchenie Buddy, serialization completed)
 Anthony Gilbert 
 Murder Comes Home
 A Nice Cup of Tea
Frank Gilbreth, Jr. and Ernestine Gilbreth Carey – Belles on Their Toes
Winston Graham – Night Without Stars
Vasily Grossman – Stalingrad
Giovanni Guareschi – The Little World of Don Camillo
Frank Hardy – Power Without Glory
Ernest Hemingway – Across the River and Into the Trees
John Hersey – The Wall
Robert Hichens – Beneath the Magic
Patricia Highsmith – Strangers on a Train
Elizabeth Jane Howard – The Beautiful Visit
Robert E. Howard – Conan the Conqueror
Hammond Innes –  The Angry Mountain
MacKinlay Kantor – Lee and Grant at Appomattox
Margaret Kennedy – The Feast
Jack Kerouac – The Town and the City
Frances Parkinson Keyes – Joy Street
Damon Knight – To Serve Man (short stories)
Manuel Mujica Láinez – Misteriosa Buenos Aires (short stories)
Doris Lessing – The Grass Is Singing
Audrey Erskine Lindop – The Tall Headlines
E. C. R. Lorac – Accident by Design
Rose Macaulay – The World My Wilderness
Ross Macdonald – The Drowning Pool
Gladys Mitchell – Groaning Spinney
Roger Nimier – The Blue Hussar
Juan Carlos Onetti – La vida breve (A Brief Life)
Cesare Pavese – La Luna e i Falò
Mervyn Peake – Gormenghast
Pramoedya Ananta Toer – Perburuan (The Fugitive)
Kukrit Pramoj – Four Reigns (สี่แผ่นดิน, Si Phaen Din, serialized)
Barbara Pym – Some Tame Gazelle
Ellery Queen – Double, Double
Conrad Richter – The Town
Henry Morton Robinson – The Cardinal
Cezaro Rossetti – Kredu min, sinjorino!
Budd Schulberg – The Disenchanted
 Samuel Shellabarger – The King's Cavalier
Nevil Shute – A Town Like Alice
Josef Škvorecký – Konec nylonového věku (The End of the Nylon Age)
John Steinbeck – Burning Bright
Rex Stout
Three Doors to Death
In the Best Families
Cecil Street 
 Family Affairs
 The Two Graphs
 A Village Afraid
Julian Symons – The Thirty-First of February
Edith Templeton – Summer In The Country
Tereska Torrès – Women's Barracks
Boris Vian – L'Herbe rouge
Gore Vidal – Dark Green, Bright Red
A. E. van Vogt – The Voyage of the Space Beagle
Mika Waltari – The Adventurer
Evelyn Waugh – Helena
Denton Welch – A Voice Through a Cloud
Kathleen Winsor – Star Money
Yasushi Inoue
黯い潮 (Kuroi ushio)
その人の名は云えない (Sono hito no na ha ienai)
闘牛 (Tōgyū, The Bullfight)
Frank Yerby – Floodtide

Children and young people
Mabel Esther Allan
Over the Sea to School
A School in Danger
Rev. W. Awdry – Troublesome Engines (fifth in The Railway Series of 42 books by him and his son Christopher Awdry)
Leila Berg – The Adventures of Chunky (first in the Chunky series)
Joan Mary Wayne Brown as Mary Gervaise
A Pony of Your Own
Ponies and Holidays (first two in the Georgie series of ten books)
Anthony Buckeridge – Jennings Goes to School
Beverly Cleary – Henry Huggins
C. S. Forester – Mr. Midshipman Hornblower
William Glynne-Jones – Pennants on the Main
C. S. Lewis – The Lion, the Witch and the Wardrobe (first in The Chronicles of Narnia series)
Elinor Lyon – The House in Hiding (first novel in Ian and Sovra series)
Katherine Milhous – The Egg Tree
Anne Parrish – The Story of Appleby Capple
Richard Scarry – First Book Ever
Dr. Seuss
If I Ran the Zoo
Gerald McBoing Boing
Yertle the Turtle and Other Stories
James Thurber – The 13 Clocks

Drama
Arthur Adamov
La Parodie
L'Invasion
La Grande et la Petite Manoeuvre
Bertolt Brecht – The Tutor (Der Hofmeister, adapted from Lenz)
 Wynyard Browne – The Holly and the Ivy
Emilio Carballido – Rosalba y los Llaveros
 Campbell Christie  – His Excellency
John Dighton – Who Goes There!
Friedrich Dürrenmatt – Romulus the Great (Romulus der Große)
Christopher Fry – Venus Observed
Kermit Hunter – Unto These Hills
William Inge – Come Back, Little Sheba
Eugène Ionesco – The Bald Soprano (La Cantatrice chauve)
 Benn Levy – Return to Tyassi
Frederick Lonsdale – The Way Things Go
 Roger MacDougall 
 The Gentle Gunman
 To Dorothy, a Son
 Macadam and Eve
Esther McCracken – Cry Liberty
Terence Rattigan – Who Is Sylvia?
Nelly Sachs – Eli: Ein Mysterienspiel vom Leiden Israels (verse)
 C.P. Snow – View Over the Park
John Steinbeck – Burning Bright
Vernon Sylvaine – Will Any Gentleman?

Poetry
Leah Bodine Drake – A Hornbook for Witches
Pablo Neruda – Canto General
Stevie Smith – Not Waving but Drowning

Non-fiction
Roland Bainton – Here I Stand: A Life of Martin Luther
Elizabeth David – A Book of Mediterranean Food
Victor Gollancz (ed.) – A Year of Grace
Ernst Gombrich – The Story of Art
Thor Heyerdahl – The Kon-Tiki Expedition
Octavio Paz – The Labyrinth of Solitude
Lionel Trilling – The Liberal Imagination: Essays on Literature and Society
Raymond Williams – Reading and Criticism
Cecil Woodham-Smith – Florence Nightingale
Desmond Young – Rommel: The Desert Fox

Births
January 5 – Valentina Tăzlăuanu, Moldovan essayist, journalist and theatre critic (died 2020)
January 17 – Luis López Nieves, Puerto Rican writer
January 19 – Will Weaver, American author
January 20 – Edward Hirsch, American poet
January 22 – Paul Bew, Irish historian and academic
January 24 – Benjamin Urrutia, Ecuadorian author and scholar
January 25 – Gloria Naylor, African-American novelist and academic (died 2016)
February 11 – Mauri Kunnas, Finnish children's author
February 20 – Jean-Paul Dubois, French novelist and journalist
February 26:
Irena Brežná, Slovak-Swiss writer, journalist and activist writing in German
Adam Cornford, English poet and essayist
March 17 – Peter Robinson, British-born Canadian novelist (died 2022)
March 19 – Kirsten Boie, German children's writer
March 23 – Ahdaf Soueif, Egyptian novelist
April 20 – Steve Erickson, American novelist
May 1 – Aldino Muianga, Mozambican physician and writer
May 27 – Alex Gray, Scottish crime writer
June 21 – Anne Carson, Canadian poet and scholar
June 25 – Barbara Gowdy, Canadian novelist
July 3 – Zhang Kangkang (张抗抗), Chinese writer
July 22 – Susan Eloise Hinton, American novelist
August 9 – Nicole Tourneur, French novelist (died 2011)
August 26 – Carl Deuker, American author
September 7 – Peggy Noonan, American columnist, political writer
September 16 – Henry Louis Gates, American literary critic
September 20 – James Blaylock, American fantasy author
September 28 – Christina Hoff Sommers, American author and philosopher
October 10 – Nora Roberts, American novelist
October 12 – Edward Bloor, American novelist
October 15 – Teresa Amy, Uruguayan poet and translator (died 2017)
October 17 – David Adams Richards, Canadian author
October 18 – Wendy Wasserstein, American playwright (died 2006)
October 27 – Fran Lebowitz, American writer
November 3 – Massimo Mongai, Italian author
November 4 – Charles Frazier, American novelist
December 18 – Leonard Maltin, American film critic and historian
December 20 – Sheenagh Pugh, English-born poet and novelist
December 30 – Timothy Mo, Hong Kong British novelist
unknown dates
Bandi, North Korean fiction writer
Greg McGee, New Zealand playwright and crime fiction writer
Candace Robb, American historical novelist

Deaths
January 5 – Basil Williams, English historian (born 1867)
January 8 – Joseph Schumpeter, Austrian/American political economist (born 1883)
January 21 – George Orwell (Eric Arthur Blair), English novelist (tuberculosis, born 1903)
February 7 – D. K. Broster, English historical novelist (born 1877)
February 13 – Rafael Sabatini, Italian-born English-language novelist (born 1875)
February 24 – Irving Bacheller, American journalist and novelist (born 1859)
March 5 – Edgar Lee Masters, American poet (born 1868)
March 11 – Heinrich Mann, German novelist (born 1871)
March 19 – Edgar Rice Burroughs, American author (born 1875)
March 22 – Emmanuel Mounier, French philosopher, journalist and theologian (born 1905)
circa March 30 – Henric Streitman, Romanian essayist and journalist (born 1873)
April 1 – F. O. Matthiessen, American historian and literary critic (born 1902)
April 4 – Cuthbert Whitaker, English yearbook editor (born 1873)
April 8 – Albert Ehrenstein, Austrian Expressionist poet (born 1886)
April 27 – H. Bonciu, Romanian novelist, poet and translator (cancer, born 1893)
May 6 – Agnes Smedley, American journalist and writer (born 1892)
May 8 – Cezaro Rossetti, Scottish-born Esperanto writer (born 1901)
May 10 – Belle da Costa Greene, American librarian (born 1883)
May 11 – Alfred O. Andersson, English-born American journalist and newspaper publisher (born 1874)
June 4 – George Cecil Ives, German-born English poet, writer and reformer (born 1867)
June 14 – Katharine Glasier, English writer and socialist (born 1867)
July 7 – Guy Gilpatric, American short story writer (suicide, born 1896)
August 27 – Cesare Pavese, Italian poet and novelist (born 1908)
September 6 – Olaf Stapledon, English philosopher and science fiction writer (heart attack, born 1886)
September 18 – Henrik Rytter, Norwegian dramatist, lyricist and translator (born 1887)
October 9 – Nicolai Hartmann, German-Latvian philosopher (born 1882)
October 19 – Edna St. Vincent Millay, American poet (heart attack, born 1892)
October 31 – Herbert Kelly, English religious writer and cleric (born 1860)
November 2 – George Bernard Shaw, Irish dramatist, critic and activist (born 1856)
November 25 – Johannes V. Jensen, Danish author (born 1873)
December 28 – Sigizmund Krzhizhanovsky, Soviet short-story writer (born 1887)
December 31 – Xavier Villaurrutia, Mexican poet and dramatist (born 1903)
unknown dates
Edith Escombe, English fiction writer and essayist (born 1866)
Helen Rowland, American journalist and humorist (born 1875)

Awards
Carnegie Medal for children's literature: Elfrida Vipont, The Lark on the Wing
James Tait Black Memorial Prize for fiction: Robert Henriques, Through the Valley
James Tait Black Memorial Prize for biography: Cecil Woodham-Smith, Florence Nightingale
Mystery Writer Of Japan – Kazuo Shimada, Shakai-bu Kisha ("City Reporter")
Newbery Medal for children's literature: Marguerite de Angeli, The Door in the Wall
Newdigate prize: John Bayley
Nobel Prize for Literature: Bertrand Russell
Premio Nadal: Elena Quiroga, Viento del norte
Pulitzer Prize for Drama: Richard Rodgers, Oscar Hammerstein II, Joshua Logan, South Pacific
Pulitzer Prize for Fiction: A. B. Guthrie, Jr., The Way West
Pulitzer Prize for Poetry: Gwendolyn Brooks, Annie Allen (first African American winner)

References

 
Years of the 20th century in literature